The Deputy Minister in the Prime Minister's Department (Malay: Timbalan Menteri di Jabatan Perdana Menteri; ; Tamil: பிரதமர் துறையில் துணை அமைச்சர் ) is a Malaysian cabinet position serving as deputy head of the Prime Minister's Department.

List of Deputy Ministers in the Prime Minister's Department
The following individuals have been appointed as Deputy Minister in the Prime Minister's Department, or any of its precedent titles:

Political Party:

See also
 Minister in the Prime Minister's Department

References

Prime Minister's Department (Malaysia)